Sylwester Ambroziak (born 14 April 1964) is a Polish sculptor. 

He studied at the Academy of Fine Arts in Warsaw in the Sculpture Department in the years 1983–1989 under professors Jerzy Jarnuszkiewicz, Stanisław Kulon and Grzegorz Kowalski. He has exhibited his work all around Europe and North America since 1986 including Warsaw, Stockholm, Montreal, Vienna, Düsseldorf, Ostrava, Poznań, Stockholm, London and Amsterdam.

References

See also
List of Polish sculptors

Polish sculptors
Polish male sculptors
1964 births
Living people
Academy of Fine Arts in Warsaw alumni